The Indian Journal of Medical Microbiology is a peer-reviewed open-access medical journal published by Medknow Publications on behalf of the Indian Association of Medical Microbiology. The journal publishes articles on  medical microbiology including bacteriology, virology, phycology, mycology, parasitology, and protozoology.

Abstracting and indexing 
The journal is indexed in Abstracts on Hygiene and Communicable Diseases, Bioline International, CAB Abstracts, CINAHL, CSA databases, EBSCO, Excerpta Medica/EMBASE, Expanded Academic ASAP, Global Health, Health & Wellness Research Center, Health Reference Center Academic, IndMed,  MedInd, MEDLINE/Index Medicus, Science Citation Index Expanded, Scopus, SIIC databases, Tropical Diseases Bulletin, and Ulrich's Periodicals Directory.

See also
 Open access in India

External links 
 

Open access journals
Quarterly journals
English-language journals
Microbiology journals
Medknow Publications academic journals
Publications established in 1983
1983 establishments in Maharashtra
Academic journals associated with learned and professional societies of India